Goose Gap is a small pass connecting Badger Mountain to Candy Mountain to the west of Richland, Washington. It lies significantly higher than most of the Tri-Cities and is crossed by Interstate 182 just after its western terminus. An average of 18,000 people cross Goose Gap daily.

There are residential areas on both sides of I-182 to the east of the gap, but to the west is mostly agriculture. The non-profit organization Friends of Badger Mountain is planning a new hiking trail to connect Badger Mountain to Candy Mountain, which will cross Goose Gap in a north-to-south direction, perpendicular to the Interstate.

See also

 Interstate 182

References

Landforms of Benton County, Washington
Tri-Cities, Washington
Transportation in Benton County, Washington
Mountain passes of Washington (state)